Stadionul Conpet is a multi-purpose stadium, frequently used for football. It is located in Strejnicu, Prahova County. It is occasionally the home ground of Astra II and was the home ground of Conpet. The stadium holds 1,732 people.

During the 2010–11 season, Petrolul Ploiești played their home matches at Conpet Stadium because of the rebuilding of their stadium Ilie Oană.

References

Football venues in Romania
Multi-purpose stadiums in Romania